Złota is a river of Poland, a right-bank tributary of the San, which it meets in the south-eastern village of Kuryłówka.

Amenities
Near the village of Ożanna a small reservoir (Zalew Ożanna) was created which is surrounded by tourist accommodation and a camping site. As of 2021 it was the subject of a study to establish if aeration treatment can alleviate its pollution levels.

Złota stream
There is a second, smaller Złota which also drains into the San approximately 3km north of this river's mouth after passing through the village of Kulno.

References

Rivers of Podkarpackie Voivodeship
Rivers of Poland